Filip Daems (born 31 October 1978) is a Belgian former professional footballer who played as a defender.

Club career
Daems kicked off his career with  Verbroedering Geel in 1995, staying with the club till 1998 in the Belgian second division. During his stint with the club, he played 40 times and also scored two goals. Between 1998 and 2001, he played for Belgian Pro League club, featuring 83 times and finding the net thrice. Then he went to play for Turkish club Gençlerbirliği from 2001 to 2005, spending four seasons, playing 98 times and finding the net 13 times.

In January 2005, Daems signed for German club Borussia Mönchengladbach, penning a contract till June 2008. In his first season with the club, he played 11 times without scoring a goal. He would play the first match of the 2005–06 season against Schalke 04 in single goal draw. He would end the season featuring 22 times for the German club. However, he spent the 2006–07 season with the reserves, Borussia Mönchengladbach II, in the Regionalliga Nord, the then third tier of German football. For the 2007–08 season, the club played in 2. Bundesliga and Daems even scored a goal against 1. FC Köln. Mönchengladbach won the second tier and gained promotion to the 2008–09 Bundesliga. During that season, he scored two goals, one against Eintracht Frankfurt and one against Bayern Munich. In the 2009–10 season, he played 18 times scoring one goal. The goal was scored against TSG 1899 Hoffenheim, where he scored a 31st-minute penalty. In the 2010–11 season, he played the whole ninety minutes of each of the 34 league matches. Daems also scored four times against Schalke 04, VfL Wolfsburg, Hoffenheim and Köln.

Career statistics

Club

Honours
Lierse SK
 Belgian Cup: 1998–99
 Belgian Super Cup: 1999

Bayer Leverkusen
2. Bundesliga: 2007–08
DFB-Pokal semi-finalist: 2011–12

References

External links

 
 
 

Living people
1978 births
Sportspeople from Turnhout
Association football defenders
Belgian footballers
Belgium international footballers
Belgian expatriate footballers
Lierse S.K. players
Gençlerbirliği S.K. footballers
Borussia Mönchengladbach players
K.V.C. Westerlo players
Belgian Pro League players
Süper Lig players
Bundesliga players
2. Bundesliga players
Expatriate footballers in Turkey
Expatriate footballers in Germany
Footballers from Antwerp Province